Farouk Mahmoud (born 18 October 1944) is an Egyptian former footballer. He competed in the men's tournament at the 1964 Summer Olympics.

References

External links
 
 

1944 births
Living people
Egyptian footballers
Egypt international footballers
Olympic footballers of Egypt
Footballers at the 1964 Summer Olympics
1970 African Cup of Nations players
Place of birth missing (living people)
Association football forwards
Olympic Club (Egypt) players